is a railway station in the Usuki area of the city of Kagoshima, Kagoshima Prefecture, Japan. The station is on the Ibusuki Makurazaki Line of the Kyushu Railway Company (JR Kyushu). 

The station is at ground level, and has one side platform serving one track. The station is staffed by an employee of a wholly owned subsidiary of the railway. 

Usuki is about 5 km from Kagoshima-Chūō Station in the center of Kagoshima. 

Near Usuki Station are several facilities. Among them are
Wakida Station, a stop on the Taniyama Line of the Kagoshima City Transportation Bureau
The Sakuragaoka Danchi apartment complex
A shopping arcade, a mall and various other retail outlets, including Yamada Denki and Deodeo stores
The local JA branch
Kagoshima University Medical And Dental Hospital

The station appears in the manga Go!! Southern Ice Hockey Club by Kōji Kumeta.

Adjacent stations

See also
Usuki Station (Oita)
List of railway stations in Japan

External links
Station Information (JR Kyūshū)
Usuki Station timetable JR Kyushu

 
Railway stations in Kagoshima Prefecture
Stations of Kyushu Railway Company